The "Itaipava São Paulo Indy 300 presented by Nestlé" was the fourth race of the 2012 IZOD IndyCar Series season. The race took place on April 29, 2012, on the  temporary street circuit in São Paulo, Brazil, and was telecasted by the NBC Sports Network in the United States and TV Bandeirantes in Brazil.

Classification

Starting grid

Race results

Notes
 Points include 1 point for pole position and 2 points for most laps led.

Standings after the race

Drivers' Championship

Manufacturers' Championship

Note: Only the top five positions are included for the driver standings.

External links
2012 São Paulo Indy 300 race broadcast

Sao Paulo Indy 300
São Paulo Indy 300
Sao Paulo Indy 300
Sao Paulo Indy 300